Bonneville International Corporation is a media and broadcasting company, wholly owned by the Church of Jesus Christ of Latter-day Saints (LDS Church) through its for-profit arm, Deseret Management Corporation. It began as a radio and TV network in the Triad Center Broadcast House in Salt Lake City, Utah.  Bonneville's name alludes to Benjamin Bonneville and the prehistoric Lake Bonneville that once covered much of modern-day Utah, which was named after him.
  
Bonneville owns 13 radio stations in four major markets as well as one television station in its home market; it also manages eight additional radio stations in two markets under a local marketing agreement. Additionally, its Bonneville Communications division provides marketing and communications strategy and branding services. Bonneville Distribution, another division, provides broadcast syndication and distribution services to non-profit organizations.

History
Bonneville International was formed in 1964, with approval of the LDS Church's First Presidency.  It was formed to acquire KSL-AM-FM-TV in its hometown of Salt Lake City, as well as KIRO-AM-FM-TV in Seattle, which had previously been subsidiaries of the Deseret News. The LDS Church divested itself of the Seattle stations between 1995 and 1997, but reacquired KIRO-AM 10 years later. The company has also owned stations in New York City, Dallas, Kansas City, and Los Angeles at one point.

In 1980 it formed Bonneville Communications Corporation, primarily to broadcast LDS General Conference.

Bonneville prided itself on "values-oriented programming" and community involvement, in line with the company's mission as set forth by its first president and founder, Arch L. Madsen. According to Bonneville International's website, their values reflect an understanding that "families are the basic unit of society... and that strong families build strong communities."

Due to a Federal Communications Commission (FCC) media cross-ownership rule, Bonneville was unable to purchase additional media outlets in Salt Lake City beyond its flagship cluster.  In anticipation of a rule change, Bonneville purchased four additional Salt Lake radio stations in 2002.  The FCC did not grant approval for this purchase until 2003, upon which the stations were acquired by Bonneville.  The status of this deal is still uncertain—the FCC has only granted a waiver to Bonneville, and a recent court ruling has put the FCC cross-ownership rule changes into question.

On October 4, 2004, Bonneville International announced plans to buy three stations from Emmis Communications in the Phoenix, Arizona market, in exchange for WLUP "The Loop" in Chicago and cash.

On January 4, 2006, Bonneville and The Washington Post announced that the frequencies currently used by WTOP, 1500 kHz AM and 107.7 MHz FM, would be reassigned to a new station, "Washington Post Radio."  WTOP would move to 103.5 MHz, the frequencies currently used by classical music station WGMS, which in turn would move to 104.1 and 103.9 MHz, the frequencies used by WWZZ, which would be closed.

WGMS itself would fall silent a little more than a year later, on January 22, 2007.  In its place is 1970s-1980s-adult-hits-station WXGG ("George 104"). Simultaneously, public radio station WETA-FM dropped its news/talk format in order to revive its previous classical format, via a partnership with Bonneville.  WETA would also receive WGMS' entire music library, hired WGMS' last program director, and also retained the usage of the WGMS call sign.  George 104 would last less than four months, when in April 2007, it was announced that the 104.1 frequency would be LMA'd to Radio One.  On April 7, 2007, the frequency would flip to a Gospel and Inspiration format, known as Praise 104.1.

The Washington Post Radio experiment ended in September 2007, as the three stations
(including the powerful AM 1500 signal) became WWWT, or "3WT". Hosts include
syndicated hosts from the Right (Bill O'Reilly, Glenn Beck, Neal Boortz) and Left
(Stephanie Miller) as well as Washington Nationals baseball. The station's morning show will continue.

Rush Limbaugh once worked for Bonneville Communications, after his stint with the Kansas City Royals.

CBS Radio has announced that it would sell 50 radio stations in 12 markets to focus on major market stations. As of September 22, 2008, Bonneville is one of the seven candidates to make first-round bids.

On August 12, 2009; Citadel Broadcasting has rumored that they're planning to sell the former Disney/ABC's 23 stations to reduce its debt load, however several financial factors may put the deal at risk. While not all the stations can be sold off, Bonneville has expressed interest in 2 FM stations in Washington D.C. (WJZW and WRQX).

On January 19, 2011, Bonneville announced it would sell 17 radio stations in Cincinnati, Chicago, Washington, D.C., and St. Louis to Hubbard Broadcasting for $505 million.  The deal closed May 2, 2011.

On November 17, 2017, Bonneville began operating four San Francisco radio stations and four Sacramento radio stations under a local marketing agreement on behalf of the Entercom Divestiture Trust, following Entercom's merger with CBS Radio. On August 3, 2018, Bonneville acquired the stations outright for $141 million; the deal had been delayed by succession issues related to the death of LDS Church president Thomas S. Monson the preceding January.

On September 30, 2021, it was announced that Bonneville International, owner of the KSL AM and FM stations, would be taking over operations of The Zone sports network. The arrangement with Bonneville will result in select Utah Jazz games being aired on KSL. Founding host Gordon Monson and some producers were laid off by the new management. The Zone introduced a new lineup effective October 20.

Bonneville-owned stations 
Stations are arranged in alphabetical order by state and city of license.

Note: Two boldface asterisks appearing following a station's call letters (**) indicates a station that was built and signed-on by a predecessor of Bonneville International.

Television station

Radio stations 

On September 30, 2021, Bonneville International, owner of KSL and KSL-TV, began operating KZNS/KZNS-FM "The Zone" in Salt Lake City under a local marketing agreement with Jazz Communications LLC, through the sports division of KSL News Radio. The operating agreement will allow select Utah Jazz games to be simulcast on KSL-AM 1160 and KSL-FM 102.7. Gordon Monson and Austin Horton were among the long time employees of The Zone who were dismissed as a result of KSL Sports assuming operations of KZNS. Although KSL Sports is responsible for overseeing daily operations of KZNS, Ryan Smith dba Jazz Communications LLC retains ownership of both 1280 AM and 97.5 FM according to the FCC database. The Zone's website at 1280thezone.com is now a dead link. The stations can now be streamed at kslsports.com/thezone/. In June 2022, The Zone officially moved its operations from Vivint Arena to newly built studios and office space in the Triad Center, joining the other radio stations (KSL (radio network), KSFI, KRSP-FM) and KSL-TV, as well as Deseret News, a print newspaper owned by the parent company of Bonneville International. KSL News Radio, KSL-TV, KSL.com, and Deseret News share a consolidated newsroom.

Former Bonneville-owned stations

Television stations 

From 2010 to 2016, Bonneville International also operated an independent TV station, KJZZ-TV (channel 14), in Salt Lake City, under a local marketing agreement with Larry H. Miller Communications Corporation. The arrangement ended when Sinclair Broadcast Group acquired KJZZ-TV.

Former radio stations

See also 
 Media in Salt Lake City

Footnotes

Further reading

External links 
 

 
1964 establishments in Utah
American companies established in 1964
Broadcasting companies of the United States
Companies based in Salt Lake City
Mass media companies established in 1964
Radio broadcasting companies of the United States
Television broadcasting companies of the United States